Orhan Atik (born 25 February 1967) is a Turkish football coach and former player.

References

External links
 

1967 births
Living people
People from Pütürge
Turkish footballers
Süper Lig players
Galatasaray S.K. footballers
Bakırköyspor footballers
Antalyaspor footballers
Yimpaş Yozgatspor footballers
Göztepe S.K. footballers
Turkish football managers
Süper Lig managers
Beylerbeyi S.K. managers
Antalyaspor managers
Galatasaray A2 football managers
Galatasaray S.K. (football) managers
Association football defenders